Alec Eric Lindstrom (born July 7, 1998) is an American football center for the Dallas Cowboys of the National Football League (NFL). He played college football at Boston College.

Early life and high school
Lindstrom grew up in Dudley, Massachusetts and attended Shepherd Hill Regional High School. He committed to play college football at Boston College over an offer from UMass.

College career
Lindstrom missed his freshman year due to injury and redshirted the season. He was named the Eagles' starting center going into his redshirt sophomore season and started all 13 of the teams games and was named third team All-Atlantic Coast Conference (ACC). He was named first team All-ACC as a redshirt junior after starting 11 games for the team. After considering entering the 2021 NFL Draft, Lindstrom decided to return to Boston College for a fifth season. He repeated as a first team All-ACC selection in 2021 and was a finalist for the Rimington Trophy.

Professional career

Lindstrom signed with the Dallas Cowboys as an undrafted free agent in 2022. He was waived on August 30, 2022 and signed to the practice squad the next day. He was placed on the practice squad/injured list on November 16, 2022.

Personal life
Lindstrom's older brother, Chris Lindstrom, plays for the Atlanta Falcons. His father, Chris Sr., was a defensive lineman at Boston University and played in the NFL and USFL. His uncle, Dave Lindstrom, played for the Kansas City Chiefs for eight seasons and another uncle, Eric, played in NFL Europe and the Canadian Football League. He signed a reserve/future contract on January 23, 2023.

References

External links
Boston College Eagles bio
Dallas Cowboys bio

1998 births
Living people
American football centers
Boston College Eagles football players
People from Dudley, Massachusetts
Players of American football from Massachusetts
Sportspeople from Worcester County, Massachusetts
Dallas Cowboys players